NGC 1712, also known as GC 942, JH 2685, and Dunlop 112 is an open cluster in the constellation of Dorado. It is relatively small, and is located inside the Large Magellanic Cloud. NGC 1712 was originally discovered in 1826 by James Dunlop, although Herschel rediscovered it in 1834. Nine variable stars have been discovered in it so far, with three suspected to be binary systems.

References 

1712
Open clusters
Dorado (constellation)
Large Magellanic Cloud
Astronomical objects discovered in 1826
Discoveries by James Dunlop